World religions is a category used in the study of religion to demarcate the five—and in some cases more—largest and most internationally widespread religious movements. Hinduism, Buddhism, Judaism, Christianity, and Islam are always included in the list, being known as the "Big Five". Some scholars also include other world religions, such as Taoism, Jainism, Sikhism, Zoroastrianism, and the Baháʼí Faith, in the category. These are often juxtaposed against other categories, such as indigenous religions and new religious movements, which are also used by scholars in this field of research.

The world religions paradigm was developed in the United Kingdom during the 1960s, where it was pioneered by phenomenological scholars like Ninian Smart. It was designed to broaden the study of religion away from its heavy focus on Christianity by taking into account other large religious traditions around the world. The paradigm is often used by lecturers instructing undergraduate students in the study of religion and is also the framework used by school teachers in the United Kingdom and other countries. The paradigm's emphasis on viewing these religious movements as distinct and mutually exclusive entities has also had a wider impact on the categorisation of religion—for instance in censuses—in both Western countries and elsewhere.

Since the late 20th century, the paradigm has faced critique by scholars of religion like Jonathan Z. Smith, some of whom have argued for its abandonment. Critics have argued that the world religions paradigm is inappropriate because it takes the Protestant form of Christianity as the model for what constitutes "religion"; that it is tied up with discourses of modernity, including modern power relations; that it encourages an uncritical understanding of religion; and that it makes a value judgment as to what religions should be considered "major". Others have argued that it remains useful in the classroom, so long as students are made aware that it is a socially-constructed category.

Definition
The scholars of religion Christopher R. Cotter and David G. Robertson described the "World Religions Paradigm" as "a particular way of thinking about religions which organizes them into a set of discrete traditions with a supposedly 'global' import." It typically consists of the "Big Five" religions: Christianity, Judaism, Islam, Hinduism, and Buddhism. 
As noted by Cotter and Robertson, the "Big Five" religions are often listed in an "Abrahamocentric order" which places the largest three Abrahamic religions—Christianity, Judaism, and Islam—before the non-Abrahamic religions Hinduism and Buddhism. The category is sometimes also extended to include other religious groups, namely Sikhism, Zoroastrianism, and the Baháʼí Faith.

The inclusion of Judaism in the Big Five raises some issues; it is included in the list because of its influence on Christianity and Islam and because of its relevance to traditional Western understandings of Western history. On demographic grounds, it does not fit into the list, for there are far fewer Jews in the world than there are Christians, Muslims, Hindus, and Buddhists. Similarly, it does not fit into the list if the groups are defined by a desire to spread internationally, because Judaism is typically non-proselytizing.

Many scholars have utilised the "World Religions" category alongside other "catch-all" categories such as "new religious movements" and "indigenous religions". The scholar of religion Steven J. Sutcliffe compared the relationship between the three categories to the English football league system, with the "world" religions forming a Premier League, the "new" religions forming a Championship, and "indigenous" religions a First Division. That groups that get placed in categories like "indigenous religions" get treated less seriously than the "world religions" by many scholars was noted by the scholar of religion Graham Harvey, who maintained that "indigenous religions should receive similarly respectful treatment to that considered appropriate to the larger 'World Religions'."

History

Cotter and Robertson noted that the history of the world religions paradigm is "intimately tied up" with the history of the study of religion as an academic discipline. It emerged from within the phenomenology of religion approach which placed an emphasis on description rather than critical analysis.

The paradigm was integrated throughout the education system through work of scholars like Ninian Smart, who formed the Shap Working Party on World Religions in Education in 1969. It was introduced with the intent of moving Western education away from its focus on Christianity. However, it took liberal Western Protestantism as its baseline and interpreted these different religious traditions through the framework of liberal Protestant norms and values. This included an emphasis on theology as being central to a given religion. It also reflects the post-Enlightenment Christian approach of treating different religious groups as distinct, mutually exclusive categories. It thus reflects the socio-political concerns of 1960s Britain, the environment in which it was devised.

The paradigm has since gone beyond this academic discipline, and "informs the perception" of many members of different religious groups. The paradigm for instance frames the teaching about religion in the British education system; at all three Key Stages, British teachers are instructed to teach about Christianity, while by the end of key Stage 3 they are also supposed to teach about the other "five principal religions": Buddhism, Hinduism, Islam, Judaism, and Sikhism. Similarly, the censuses of many countries for instance reflect the influence of the world religion paradigm by only permitting respondents to describe themselves as adhering to one particular religious tradition, whereas in reality many individuals identify themselves with various different traditions at the same time. This idea of mutually exclusive religious identities is not only a Western phenomenon, but can also be found in other socio-cultural contexts; Hindu nationalists for instance often endorse the idea that Hinduism and Buddhism are mutually exclusive categories despite the fact that many people in South Asia mix Hindu and Buddhist practices.
The scholars of religion Tara Baldrick-Morrone, Michael Graziano, and Brad Stoddard stated that "the WRP is neither neutral nor natural, but its social authority derives from appearing as both."

Criticism

The utility of the  World Religions Paradigm has experienced a sustained and rigorous critique from many scholars of religion. The scholar of religion Graham Harvey for instance noted that many scholars "object strongly" to the paradigm. In 1978, the scholar of religion Jonathan Z. Smith for example called it a "dubious category".

One of the major criticisms of the framework is that it is based on a model of 'religion' that is highly reliant on using the Protestant version of Christianity as its base example. A second criticism is that it is rooted in the discourses of modernity, including the power relations present in modern society. Smith observed that it was constructed by Western scholars from a Western perspective. He noted that the only religions that get included in it are those which have "achieved sufficient power and numbers to enter our [i.e. Western] history, either to form it, interact with it, or to thwart it" and represent "important geo-political entities with which we must deal." The framework also includes privileging the literate elites active in particular religious movements by presenting their interpretations of particular traditions as being authoritative, eclipsing alternative interpretations presented by non-literate, marginalised, and localized practitioners. For instance, as noted by the scholar of religion Suzanne Owen, "Hinduism as a World Religion does not include Hinduism as a village religion".

A third criticism of the world religions paradigm is that it encourages an uncritical and sui generis model of 'religion'. It presents each of the 'world religions' in an abstracted and essentialised form, failing to take account of hybridization. For instance, in teaching about Christianity it does not refer to reincarnation, because this is not typically regarded as a Christian doctrine, and yet there are Christians who profess a belief in reincarnation.
A fourth criticism is that in choosing to focus attention on the "major" religions, it makes a value judgement as to what constitutes "major" and what does not.

Paradigm in pedagogy

Many scholars of religion have resisted efforts to challenge the paradigm, and as of 2016 was reported as still being widespread in university introductory courses to the study of religion. Many instructors feel that explaining the critique of the world religions paradigm to undergraduate students would be difficult, as the critique would be too complex for many of them to understand. Its continued use has also been defended by the claim that it is what undergraduate students expect and that it mirrors what they will have been taught at school.

Some scholars have argued for the rejection of the world religions paradigm altogether; Cotter and Robertson presented the argument that "the continued uncritical use of the WRP fosters a breeding ground for relativistic navel-gazing which has no place in the contemporary research university". Owen was of the view that "as long as it continues to employ the World Religions paradigm as a default approach (even after deconstructing it), religious studies will fail in its humanistic task" because it will simply be engaging in "knowledge transfer" and not "critically engaging" with "culture and knowledge". One alternative framework that some scholars use to teach about religion is the "lived religion" paradigm, which places emphasis not on distinct religious traditions but on individual experiences and practices. Another alternative is the "material religion" framework which focuses on examining religion through material culture and physical objects. Owen noted that, in her experience, many students display an "initial resistance to alternatives" as they are expecting the world religions paradigm. She cited the example of her introductory course at Leeds Trinity University College, which was constructed on thematic lines rather than according to the world religions paradigm, and which induced feelings of panic among many undergraduates.

Many scholars who are critical of the world religions paradigm find themselves having to teach it as part of introductory courses for undergraduate students. Some spent much of a course teaching the concept and then several sessions after this deconstructing it. Some scholars have suggested that even when students are taught using the world religions paradigm, it could be a good means of encouraging them to think critically about category formation. The scholar Steven W. Ramey for instance advocated teaching the paradigm in a manner that makes it clear that it is a "constructed discourse". Similarly, Baldrick-Morrone, Graziano, and Stoddard suggested that teaching undergraduates about the world religious paradigm helps to explain to students how "classification is a social act". They noted that students could leave such a course not only knowing more about the specific religious traditions included in the world religions category, but that they would also leave "knowing how to better interrogate the world around them". To avoid promoting the paradigm's portrayal of different religious traditions as rigid, homogenous categories, the scholar Teemu Taira suggested introducing ethnographic case studies into the class to better explain the realities of people's lives and uses of religious traditions.

See also

 Major religious groups
 List of religious populations

References

Citations

Bibliography

Further reading

External links
 James Cox on "The World Religions Paradigm" at The Religious Studies Project
 "After the World Religions Paradigm...?" at The Religious Studies Project

Religious faiths, traditions, and movements
Religious studies
Social constructionism